USS Powers may refer to more than one United States Navy ship:

 , a destroyer escort in commission from 1944 to 1945
 , a destroyer escort cancelled in 1946

United States Navy ship names